A prune is a dried fruit of various plum species.

Prune may also refer to:

 Pruning, the practice of removing undesired portions from a plant
 Prune fingers, the wrinkling of skin after immersion in water
 Prune Nourry, a French artist working in New York

See also
 Pruning (disambiguation)
 PPRuNe, an Internet forum for airline pilots etc. in the aviation industry
 Prune plum, a plum subspecies used for making prunes